Pillager is a town in Minnesota, U.S.

It may also refer to:
 One who pillages; see looting
 Pillager Band of Chippewa Indians
 A mob from Minecraft